Jan Christoffel Gmelich Meijling (4 February 1936 – 2 June 2012) was a Dutch politician of the People's Party for Freedom and Democracy (VVD) and naval officer. He served as Mayor of Castricum from April 16, 1978 until June 1, 1985 when he became Mayor of Den Helder serving until August 22, 1994 when he became State Secretary for Defence in the Cabinet Kok I from August 22, 1994 until August 3, 1998.

Decorations

References

External links

Official
  Drs. J.Ch. (Jan) Gmelich Meijling Parlement & Politiek

1936 births
2012 deaths
Aldermen in South Holland
Dutch lobbyists
Dutch nonprofit directors
Knights of the Order of Orange-Nassau
Leiden University alumni
Mayors in North Holland
People from Castricum
People from Den Helder
People from Heemstede
People from Wassenaar
People's Party for Freedom and Democracy politicians
Royal Netherlands Naval College alumni
Royal Netherlands Navy officers
State Secretaries for Defence of the Netherlands
Vice Chairmen of the People's Party for Freedom and Democracy
20th-century Dutch civil servants
20th-century Dutch military personnel
20th-century Dutch politicians